Radiant is a 2018 Japanese anime series based on French author Tony Valente's manfra series of the same name, which is published in Japan by Asukashinsha. It follows the main protagonist, Seth, as he looks for the legendary Radiant in order to defeat creatures called Nemesis. The series is directed by Seiji Kishi and Daisei Fukuoka, and written by Makoto Uezu, with animation by studio Lerche.  Character designs for the series are produced by Nozomi Kawano, and Masato Koda is composing the series' music.

The 21-episode anime series aired on NHK Educational TV from October 6, 2018 to February 23, 2019. It is based on volumes 1 through 4 of the manfra. The series is simulcast by Crunchyroll, with Funimation producing an English dub as it aired.

In the season finale, a 21-episode second season was announced. It premiered on October 2, 2019.

The series received a French dub which first aired on Game One in France on September 2, 2019.

Funimation's English dub of Radiant began airing on ABC Me in Australia starting on January 2, 2021.

Series overview

Episode list

Season 1 (2018–19)

Season 2 (2019–20)

See also
List of Radiant volumes

Notes

References

Radiant
Radiant episode lists